Caesiana (printed as CAESIANA) is the Italian journal of Orchidology - the official journal of the Italian Orchid Association. 

Publication began in 1993. Since 2001 it has also become the official journal of the European Orchid Congress (EOC). The publication is printed twice a year and is available for subscription outside the European Union. 

A typical issue includes roughly 60 pages of Italian/English articles, taxonomic works, EOC proceedings, culture sheets, field work, propagation about tropical, subtropical and temperate orchids with color photographs.

References

External links 
 Associazione Italiana di Orchidologia online (In Italian)
 CAESIANA web page

Botany journals
Publications about orchids
Publications established in 1993
Biannual journals
Italian-language journals
Academic journals published by learned and professional societies